Luciana Curtis (born December 12, 1976) is a Brazilian model.   She was born in São Paulo to a Brazilian mother and an English father.  She has been in advertisements for the likes of: Arden B., Bebe, Bergdorf Goodman, Charlie Miller, Coccinelle, CoverGirl, Harrods, H&M, Victoria's Secret, L'Oréal, and two years contract with Revlon.  She began modeling at age 14.

She is married to photographer Henrique Gendre.

References

External links
Fashion Model Directory

1976 births
Living people
People from São Paulo
Brazilian female models
Brazilian people of English descent